Bernard Pivot (born 5 May 1935) is a French journalist, interviewer and host of cultural television programmes. He was chairman of the Académie Goncourt from 2014 to 2020.

Biography
Pivot was born in Lyon, the son of two grocers. During World War II, his father, Charles Pivot, was taken prisoner and his mother moved the family home to the village of Quincié-en-Beaujolais, where Bernard Pivot started school.

In 1945, his father was released and the reunited family returned to Lyon. At age 10, Pivot went to a Catholic boarding school where he discovered a passion for sport, while he was more average at traditional school subjects, except French language and history.

After starting law studies in Lyon, Pivot entered the Centre de formation des journalistes (CFJ) in Paris, where he met his future wife, Monique. He graduated second in his class.

After an internship at Le Progrès in Lyon, he studied economic journalism for a full year, and then joined the Figaro Littéraire in 1958.

In 1970, he hosted a humorous daily radio programme which often raised political issues and was not appreciated by President Georges Pompidou.

In 1971, the Figaro Littéraire closed and Pivot joined Le Figaro. He left in 1974 after a disagreement with Jean d'Ormesson. Jean-Jacques Servan-Schreiber invited him to start a new project, which led to the creation of a new magazine, Lire, a year later.

Meanwhile, he had begun hosting a television program in April 1973 called Ouvrez les Guillemets on France's first TV network. In 1974, the ORTF was dissolved and Pivot started his Apostrophes programme. Apostrophes was first broadcast on Antenne 2 on 10 January 1975, and ran until 1990.

Pivot then created Bouillon de culture, with the aim of broadening people's interests beyond reading. However, he eventually returned to books.

On 10 April 2008, Pivot was made an honorary member of the Order of Canada.

In the month before the UK was due to leave the European Union in October 2019 after three years of fruitless public debate, Pivot tweeted (in translation): “I propose to insert the word “brexit” (without capital letter) into the French language. It will indicate a cacophonous and insoluble debate, a bloody shambolic reunion or assembly. Example: the meeting of the joint owners ended in brexit.” (The inclusion of the British expletive is supported two-fold by the Collins-Robert French Dictionary.)

Spelling championships

In 1985, Pivot created the Championnats d'orthographe (Spelling Championships) with linguist Micheline Sommant, which in 1992 became Championnats mondiaux d'orthographe (World Spelling Championships), then the Dicos d'or (Golden Dictionaries) in 1993.

These yearly contests are held in three phases:
During the spring, selection tests are organised with the press, in particular with Lire, and in a few local communities (e.g. schools). These are multiple-choice questionnaires.
 During the fall, the selected candidates meet region by region at the semi-finals. They are again given multiple-choice questionnaires, plus a dictation.
 During winter, the finals are held in one place.

There are four categories: school juniors, juniors, professional seniors and amateur seniors.

Participation is free of charge, except for the cost of the magazines that publish the selection tests.

Partial filmography
 Apostrophes (1975–1986)
 Bouillon de culture (1991–2001)
 Double je (2002–2005)

Bernard Pivot and James Lipton
James Lipton was inspired to create Inside the Actors Studio by a chance viewing of a Pivot program on cable TV. Lipton adapted Pivot's use of a Proust Questionnaire to one that he himself used at the end of each episode of Inside the Actors Studio.

However, the question "If God exists, what would you like Him to tell you when you're dead?" was considered potentially offensive to US audiences and replaced by a more acceptable "If heaven exists, what would you like to hear God say when you arrive at the pearly gates?"

Pivot became aware that Lipton was inspired by his questionnaire and invited him to appear on the final episode of Bouillon de culture.

Controversies 
On 26 November 1973, Pivot invited the pedophile novelist Tony Duvert onto his show Ouvrez les guillemets. Duvert refused, letting his editor and supporters Jérôme Lindon and Alain Robbe-Grillet promote his book.

In January 1975, Yves Berger, the literary director of Éditions Grasset and Pierre Sabbagh's cultural adviser on the 2nd channel of French television, convinces Jacqueline Baudrier in charge of the 1st channel to replace Marc Gilbert's Italics with Pivot's Ouvrez les guillemets talk show. On 30 May 1975, he received Vladimir Nabokov, the author of Lolita on Apostrophes; on 12 December 1976, Michel Foucault, who criticised psychoanalysis and "contractual sexuality" based on consent or non-consent, with René Schérer, Guy Hocquenghem and François Châtelet; on 14 October 1983, Renaud Camus, defender of the pedophile cause; on 23 April 1982, Daniel Cohn-Bendit, who described having ambiguous relations with children in kindergarten; on 2 March 1990, Gabriel Matzneff, a noted pedophile whose book Mes amours décomposés was highly criticised; on 23 February 2001, Catherine Dolto, to talk about the legalization of pedophilia on Bouillon de Culture; and in 2005, Michel Tournier, whose references to pedophilia were published in La Pléiade in 2017.
 	
On 17 March 2013, Pivot defended Alexandre Postel's book Un homme effacé, which described a man who owns explicit pictures of children on his computer, and on 30 October 2016, La Mauvaise vie by Frédéric Mitterrand, as a "brave book, very brave, a kind of secular confession where each confession, as in Georges Perec's "Je me souviens…", starts with "Je regrette…".
	
In 2017, neuropsychiatrist Louis Masquin, in the Catholic review La Croix, described the introduction of pedophilic literature on French television in Pivot's shows as the "reflection of the "pedophile adventure", "considered approximately normal".

In 2019, Pivot wrote on Twitter that "cardinals, bishops and priests who rape children don't believe in heaven or hell", criticizing the influence of the Vatican II reform. In September 2019, he declared on Twitter: "In my generation, boys looked for little Swedish girls who had the reputation of being more open than French girls. I imagine our surprise, our fear, if we had approached a Greta Thunberg". Julien Bayou, from the environmentalist party, Europe Écologie – Les Verts, replied: "you're talking about a minor" and French feminist Caroline de Haas asked him to delete his post, something he refused to do. He was immediately defended by far-right essayist Éric Zemmour. In December, Pivot apologized for allowing Gabriel Matzneff to describe his relationships with teenage girls and boys on his literary talk shows without challenging him.

In July 2021, Pivot posted a controversial tweet about actress Françoise Arnoul, who had just died, in which he remarked that "young people in the 1950s dreamed about her breasts. But the ones seen in The Wreck were not hers. She confessed it to me on a broadcast. Still a minor, she was not allowed to be filmed naked."

References

External links

1935 births
Living people
French journalists
French television talk show hosts
Officers of the Order of Canada
Knights of the National Order of Quebec
Clergy from Lyon
French male non-fiction writers
Le Figaro people